Otto Wilhelm Rahn (18 February 1904 – 13 March 1939) was a German writer, medievalist, Ariosophist, and an officer of the SS and researcher into the Grail myths. He was born in Michelstadt, Germany, and died in Söll (Kufstein, Tyrol) in Austria.

Early life and work 

From an early age, Rahn became interested in the legends of Parzival, the Holy Grail, Lohengrin and the Nibelungenlied. While attending the University of Giessen, he was inspired by his professor, Baron von Gall, to study the Albigensian (Catharism) movement and the massacre that occurred at Montségur.

In 1931, he travelled to the Pyrenees region of southern France where he conducted most of his research. Aided by the French mystic and historian Antonin Gadal, Rahn argued that there was a direct link between Wolfram von Eschenbach's Parzival and the Cathar Grail mystery. He believed that the Cathars held the answer to this sacred mystery and that the keys to their secrets lay somewhere beneath the mountain peak where the fortress of Montségur remains, the last Cathar fortress to fall during the Albigensian Crusade.

SS service and death

Rahn wrote two books linking Montségur and Cathars with the Holy Grail: Kreuzzug gegen den Gral (Crusade Against the Grail) in 1933 and Luzifers Hofgesind (Lucifer's Court) in 1937. After the publication of his first book, Rahn's work came to the attention of Heinrich Himmler, the head of the SS, who was fascinated by the occult and had already initiated research in the south of France. Rahn joined his staff as a junior non-commissioned officer and became a full member of the SS in 1936, achieving the rank of Obersturmführer. Little of Rahn's writings are explicitly anti-Semitic, although some have argued that his frequent references to the devil (associated by the Cathars with the Old Testament God) are a code for the Jews and their God. 

Journeys for his second book led Rahn to places in Nazi Germany, France, Kingdom of Italy and the Kingdom of Iceland. Openly homosexual, frequenting anti-Nazi circles, and having fallen out of favour with the Nazi leadership, Rahn was assigned guard duty at the Dachau concentration camp in 1937 as punishment for a drunken homosexual scrape. He resigned from the SS in 1939.

The SS would not allow anyone to resign without consequences. Soon, Rahn learned the Gestapo was after him, and he was even offered the option of committing suicide. He vanished. On 13 March 1939, nearly on the anniversary of the fall of Montségur, Rahn was found frozen to death on a mountainside near Söll (Kufstein, Tyrol) in Austria. His death was officially ruled a suicide.

Rahn in popular culture

Rahn has been the object of many rumours and strange stories, including that his death had been faked, although all such speculation has failed to be substantiated.

Richard Stanley  made a documentary about Rahn and his fixation on the Holy Grail titled The Secret Glory in 2001.
Sorcerer's Feud (2014) by Katharine Kerr is another novel that has Rahn as a character. 
 The Pale Criminal (1990), part II of Philip Kerr's Berlin Noir trilogy, has Rahn as a secondary character.
In the Italian comic book Martin Mystère, Rahn fakes his death and joins the United States Secret Service "Elsewhere".
The 2013 Snog album Babes in Consumerland features the song "Otto Rahn".
The band Civil War, in the album "Killer Angels", features the song "Lucifer's Court" about Rahn.

Works 

 Kreuzzug gegen den Gral. Die Geschichte der Albigenser (Broschiert) (in German), 1934, ; .
 Croisade contre le Graal: Grandeur et Chute des Albigeois (Broché) (French translation), 1934, ; .
 Crusade Against the Grail: The Struggle between the Cathars, the Templars, and the Church of Rome (First English Translation by Christopher Jones), 1934–2006, ; .
 Luzifers Hofgesind, eine Reise zu den guten Geistern Europas (in German), 1937, ; .
 Lucifer's Court: A Heretic's Journey in Search of the Light Bringers (English translation), 1937–2008, ; .

References

Sources 

 Nicholas Goodrick-Clarke. 1985. The Occult Roots of Nazism: Secret Aryan Cults and Their Influence on Nazi Ideology: The Ariosophists of Austria and Germany, 1890-1935; p. 188-189
 Otto Rahn and the Quest for the Holy Grail
 
 Biography at Jones' Celtic Encyclopedia

External links 

 Website dedicated to Otto Rahn, otto-rahn.com
 Raiders of the Lost Grail, an article by Richard Stanley
 
 Crusade Against the Grail by Otto Rahn the full text of the book at the Internet Archive

1904 births
1939 suicides
Catharism
Dachau concentration camp personnel
Archaeologists from Hesse
Nazi Party politicians
Holy Grail
LGBT people in the Nazi Party
Nazi Party officials
Nazis who committed suicide in Austria
People from Michelstadt
SS-Obersturmführer
Suicides by freezing
University of Giessen alumni
1939 deaths